Terence Norman Angus (born 14 January 1966) is an English retired professional footballer who played as a central defender.

Playing career
Born in Coventry, Angus played for Coventry Sporting, VS Rugby, Northampton Town, Fulham, Slough Town, Nuneaton Borough, Solihull Borough, Brackley Town and Stratford Town.

Angus was still active as a player up to the age of 40.

Later career
Angus later worked as a probation officer, for the Prince's Trust at Solihull College, and for Professional Footballers' Association.

Personal life
Angus is of Jamaican descent. He is the father of Dior Angus who is also a professional footballer.

References

External links

1966 births
Living people
Footballers from Coventry
English footballers
English sportspeople of Jamaican descent
Association football defenders
Coventry Sporting F.C. players
Rugby Town F.C. players
Northampton Town F.C. players
Fulham F.C. players
Slough Town F.C. players
Nuneaton Borough F.C. players
Solihull Borough F.C. players
Brackley Town F.C. players
Stratford Town F.C. players
English Football League players